Tagiades tethys is a species of butterfly of the family Hesperiidae. It is found in eastern Asia, including the Amur region, southern Ussuri, Japan, Taiwan and Korea. The larvae feed on various plants, including Quercus mongolica, Dioscorea nipponica, Dioscorea butatas, Dioscorea japonica and Dioscorea japonica var. pseudojaponica.

Subspecies
Tagiades tethys tethys
Tagiades tethys birmana (Yunnan)
Tagiades tethys daiseni (Japan)
Tagiades tethys roona
Tagiades tethys moori
Tagiades tethys niitakana

External links
Japanese Hesperiidae

Tagiadini
Butterflies of Asia
Butterflies described in 1857